Paul Anthony Weller (born 6 March 1975) is an English former professional footballer. Born in Brighton, after playing at Worthing, he went on to play 250 matches in the Football League for Burnley and Rochdale before retiring in 2004.

References

1975 births
Living people
Footballers from Brighton
English footballers
Association football midfielders
Burnley F.C. players
Rochdale A.F.C. players
Leek Town F.C. players
Stalybridge Celtic F.C. players
English Football League players